South Gujarat Cricket Association Ground is a cricket ground in the city of Surat in Gujarat, India. The hosted two Ranji Trophy matches for Gujarat cricket team against Baroda cricket team in 1967  and Saurashtra cricket team in 1972. The ground owned by South Gujarat Cricket Association.

See also
List of tourist attractions in Surat

References

External links
 Cricketarchive
 Cricinfo

Multi-purpose stadiums in India
Sports venues in Gujarat
Cricket grounds in Gujarat
Sports venues completed in 1967
1967 establishments in Gujarat
Sports venues in Surat
20th-century architecture in India